Cihan Ünal (born 22 January 1946) is a Turkish actor.

Biography
He finished elementary school in Tosya and Kırıkkale. After continuing his education at Ankara Cebeci Secondary School and Kurtuluş High School, he worked in Ankara Radio Children's Programs, Ankara Radio Education Programs, Radio Theater and Arkası Yarın in 1960–1964.

In the same years, he worked as an amateur actor in children's theater and private theaters. In 1962 he attended theater courses at Ankara Halkevi. Then he acted in the same institution. He received training from Nüzhet Şenbay, Nurettin Sevin, Suat Taşer, Haldun Marlalı and Mahir Canova. He also starred in the play Öteye Doğru directed by Suat Taşer. Between 1963 and 1964, he took part in small roles in Ankara State Theater plays. He entered Ankara State Conservatory in 1964.

He graduated from the Theater Department of the Conservatory in 1969 and started to work as an actor in Ankara State Theater the same year. He first played in the movie Damdaki Kemancı in 1971. His second feature film was Şeytan, one of the first Turkish horror classics. He worked as an assistant to Cüneyt Gökçer in the acting department of Ankara State Conservatory between 1971–1973. Between 1973 and 1982, he gave diction, mimic, role and stage classes as a lecturer at the same school.

In 1982, he went to London with the British Council scholarship. There he continued his education by participating in various rehearsals at the Royal National Theater and the Royal Shakespeare Company. He also worked as a guest teacher with the instructors in RADA (Royal Academy of Dramatic Art) for two months in London. He then worked at Ankara State Theater until 1983. Between 1987 and 2000, he continued his role as a lecturer at Mimar Sinan University State Conservatory's Theater Department by giving role, diction, mimic and stage lessons.

As a guest of the British Council and Royal Shakespeare Company, he attended seminars in Stratford in 1992. In 1997, he taught in a private diction and announcer course. In 1999, he taught acting and diction classes at Yeditepe University. In 2000, he taught diction, mimic, role and stage lessons at Hacettepe University State Conservatory. In 2001, he became the Head of the Theater Department at the same institution.

Theatre

State theatres 

 King Lear : William Shakespeare - Ankara State Theatre - 1980
 Bağdat Hatun : Güngör Dilmen - Ankara State Theatre - 1980
 The Liberated Don Quixote : Anatoly Lunacharsky - Ankara State Theatre - 1978
 Harold and Maude : Colin Higgins - Ankara State Theatre - 1977
 The Good Doctor : Neil Simon\Anton Chekhov - Ankara State Theatre - 1976 
 Yunus Emre : Recep Bilginer - Ankara State Theatre - 1974
 Bu Hesapta Yoktu : Nikolai Ostrovsky - Ankara State Theatre - 1973 
 The Imaginary Invalid : Molière - Ankara State Theatre - 1972
 Fatih : Turan Oflazoğlu - Ankara State Theatre - 1972
 I, Don Quixote : Dale Wasserman - Ankara State Theatre - 1971
 Becket : Jean Anouilh - Ankara State Theatre - 1971
 Romeo and Juliet : William Shakespeare - Ankara State Theatre - 1971
 Murat IV : Turan Oflazoğlu - Ankara State Theatre - 1970
 Andromaque : Jean Racine - Ankara State Theatre - 1968
 Le verre d'eau ou Les Effets et les Causes : Eugène Scribe - Ankara State Theatre - 1967
 A Dream Play : August Strindberg - Ankara State Theatre - 1964
 Peter Pan : James Matthew Barrie - Ankara State Theatre - 1964
 Julius Caesar : William Shakespeare - Ankara State Theatre - 1963

Musicals performed at state theatres 
 My Fair Lady : Alan Jay Lerner - Ankara State Theatre - 1976 
 Fiddler on the Roof : Sholem Aleichem - Ankara State Theatre - 1969

Egemen Bostancı Theatre 
 Yedi Kocalı Hürmüz : Sadık Şendil - Egemen Bostancı Theatre - 1979

Istanbul City Theatre 
 Uncle Vanya : Anton Çehov - Istanbul City Theatre - 1994
 Evita : Andrew Lloyd Webber\Tim Rice - Istanbul City Theatre - 1989

Dormen Theatre 
 Good Morning Mr. Weill : Haldun Dormen - 1991

Istanbul State Opera and Ballet 
 The Merry Widow

Tiyatro İstanbul 
 Çetin Ceviz
 Aktör Kean - 1996
 Yeni Baştan
 Sanat-(Art)
 Bu Adreste Bulunamadı
 Dönme Dolap (oyun)
 Altı Haftada Altı Dans Dersi

Theatre plays directed 
 Six Dance Lessons in Six Weeks : Richard Alfieri - Tiyatro İstanbul - 2008
 Sihirli Kelimeler : Karl Herz Gies - Ankara State Theatre - 1975

Filmography 

 Damdaki Kemancı - 1971
 Şeytan - 1974 
 Yargıç ve Celladı - 1975
 Gül ve Bülbül - 1977
 Murat IV -1980
 Kuruluş - Osmancık -1987
 Herhangi Bir Kadın 
 Seni Kalbime Gömdüm
 Mine
 Seni Seviyorum
 Bir Kadın Bir Hayat
 İhtiras Fırtınası
 Bir Sevgi İstiyorum
 Körebe
 O Kadın
 Gazap Rüzgarları
 Kalbimdeki Düşman
 Gece Dansı Tutsakları
 Kadın İsterse
 Muhteşem Yüzyıl: Kösem : Kuyucu Murad Pasha - 2016
 Söz : Büyük Bey - 2017
 Kafalar Karışık : Ünal - 2018
 Yalnız Kurt : Davut Bahadır (Kumandan) - 2022

References

External links 

 
 

1946 births
Ankara State Conservatory alumni
Turkish male stage actors
Turkish male film actors
Turkish male television actors
People from Kastamonu Province
Living people